Turki Al-Khodair (born 23 August 1987) is a Saudi Arabian footballer who plays Al-Ula for as a midfielder.

Honours
Al Ittihad
Crown Prince Cup (1): 2016–17
King Cup of Champions: 2017–18

References

External links
 

Living people
People from Medina
1987 births
Saudi Arabian footballers
Saudi Arabia international footballers
Association football midfielders
Al-Ansar FC (Medina) players
Ittihad FC players
Khaleej FC players
Al-Qaisumah FC players
Jeddah Club players
Ohod Club players
Al-Bukayriyah FC players
Al-Ula FC players
Saudi First Division League players
Saudi Professional League players
Saudi Second Division players
Saudi Third Division players